Helcogramma rosea, the rosy triplefin, is a species of triplefin blenny in the genus Helcogramma. It was described by Wouter Holleman in 2006. This species occurs in the eastern Indian Ocean around Sri Lanka and in the Andaman Sea.

References

rosea
Taxa named by Wouter Holleman
Fish described in 2006